Liou Chen Kuang is a Malaysian politician and businessman of Chinese descent from Machap Baru in Malacca state. He is a member of the Democratic Action Party (DAP) and was the party's losing candidate for the Malacca State Legislative Assembly seat of Machap in the 2004 general elections. In the 2004 election, the late Datuk Wira Poh Ah Tiam of the Barisan Nasional (BN) defeated him by a majority of 4,562 votes.

Despite the loss, on 30 March 2007, the DAP announced Liou will again contest for the party in the 2007 Machap by-election due to his  "knowledge of the local terrain", grassroots support, and his willingness "to serve Machap constituents". Liou was eventually defeated, but by a marginally smaller majority.

Election results

Notes and references 

Year of birth missing (living people)
Living people
Malaysian politicians